Larry Chatzidakis (born June 24, 1949) is an American Republican Party politician, who served in the New Jersey General Assembly from 1997 to 2008, where he represented the 8th legislative district. Chatzidakis had been appointed in 1997 to fill the Assembly seat vacated by Martha W. Bark upon her selection to fill a New Jersey Senate vacancy.

Chatzidakis served in the Assembly on the Environment and Solid Waste and the Military and Veterans' Affairs Committees. In the Assembly, Chatzidakis was the sponsor of a bill to prohibit use of cell phones while driving, and a resolution to urge the Federal Aviation Administration to replace Atlantic City Bader Field with Hammonton Municipal Airport as the reliever airport for Atlantic City International Airport. Chatzidakis served on the Mount Laurel Township Council from 1985 to 2000 and as its Mayor of Mount Laurel Township, New Jersey in 1988, 1992, 1996, and 2000. He served on the Burlington County Board of Chosen Freeholders from 1995–1997. Chatzidakis received an A.B. degree from Villanova University in Psychology. He is a resident of Mount Laurel Township.

District 8
Each of the forty districts in the New Jersey Legislature has one representative in the New Jersey Senate and two members in the New Jersey General Assembly. The other representatives from the 8th Legislative District for the 2006-2007 Legislative Session were:
Assemblyman Francis L. Bodine, and
Senator Martha W. Bark

References

External links
Assemblyman Chatzidakis's Legislative Website
Assembly Member Larry Chatzidakis, Project Vote Smart
New Jersey Voter Information Website 2003
New Jersey Legislature financial disclosure form for 2006 (PDF)
New Jersey Legislature financial disclosure form for 2005 (PDF)
New Jersey Legislature financial disclosure form for 2004 (PDF)

1949 births
Living people
Mayors of places in New Jersey
County commissioners in New Jersey
People from Mount Laurel, New Jersey
Politicians from Burlington County, New Jersey
Republican Party members of the New Jersey General Assembly
21st-century American politicians